Francisco Bethencourt is Charles Boxer professor at King's College London. He taught at Universidade Nova de Lisboa and Brown University. Bethencourt’s research centres on the history of racism, Portuguese and European expansion from the 15th to the 19th centuries, missions and religious history in the Catholic world, and identities and cultural exchange in Iberia. Bethencourt's Racisms: From the Crusades to the Twentieth Century (2013) was described as the first worldwide history of racism. It was described by Ekow Eshun in The Independent as "an unlovely history. But a necessary one".

Selected publications
Racisms: From the Crusades to the Twentieth Century. Princeton: Princeton University Press, 2013.
The Inquisition. A Global History, 1478-1834. Cambridge: Cambridge University Press, 2009.
Racism and Ethnic Relations in the Portuguese-Speaking World. London/Oxford: British Academy/Oxford University Press, 2012. (edited with Adrian Pearce)
The Portuguese Oceanic Expansion, 1400-1800. Cambridge: Cambridge University Press, 2007. (edited with Diogo Ramada Curto)
História da expansão portuguesa, 5 volumes, Lisboa: Temas e Debates e Autores, 1998-2000 (edited with Kirti Narayan Chaudhuri)

References

Academics of King's College London
Year of birth missing (living people)
Living people
Academic staff of NOVA University Lisbon